Chris Parker is an American drummer.

During his childhood, Parker's father, artist Robert Andrew Parker, attached wooden blocks to the hi-hat and bass drum pedals, so that  Parker's feet could reach the pedals to play the drums along with records. His father, who was also a jazz drummer, introduced young Parker to the music of Thelonious Monk, Miles Davis, Leadbelly, Ray Charles, Woody Herman, Count Basie, Lionel Hampton, Bix Beiderbecke, Louis Armstrong and Duke Ellington. When he became a teenager he began practicing with friends and finding out the nostalgia of rock and roll by listening to such jazz drummers as Roger Hawkins, D. J. Fontana, and New Orleans icons such as Earl Palmer, Smokey Johnson and James Black. His enthusiasm grew as he went to New York City's School of Visual Arts to study painting, where he saw an ad for a drummer. He became a member of a band called Holy Moses when he moved to Woodstock, New York. That band was short lived during which Parker recorded one album, but decided to stay in Woodstock where he also worked in the local scene with music icons such as Paul Butterfield's Better Days, Bonnie Raitt, Tim Hardin, Rick Danko, Mike Bloomfield and Merl Saunders.

Four years later he played in a band called Encyclopedia of Soul which later on became known as Stuff which was made out of bassist Gordon Edwards, two guitarists named Cornell Dupree and Eric Gale and keyboardist Richard Tee. Later on, in the same band he shared his drum with another rising star, Steve Gadd. In the same time, he cofounded Brecker Brothers, a band which was made out of Michael and Randy Brecker, Buzzy Feiten, David Sanborn, Don Grolnick, Steve Khan, and Will Lee. Throughout three decades (from 1970s to 1990s), he recorded three albums and still performs to this day with such stars and music groups as James Brown, Miles Davis, Aretha Franklin, Ashford & Simpson, Patti Austin, Cher, Michael Bolton, Quincy Jones, Freddie Hubbard and Salt n' Pepa.

In 1986, Parker was invited to be a part of Saturday Night Live and served there six years. In 1988, he became a member of Bob Dylan's touring band, which included G.E. Smith, later SNL's music director.  Parker played on Donald Fagen's Kamakiriad album, which was nominated for (but did not win) the 1993 Grammy Award for Album of the Year.

Discography

With Joe Beck
 Beck (Kudu, 1975)
With Stephen Bishop
 Red Cab to Manhattan (Warner Bros. Records, 1980)
With Bonnie Raitt
 Give It Up (Warner Bros. Records, 1972)
With Sinéad O'Connor
 Am I Not Your Girl? (Chrysalis Records, 1992)
With Cher
 Cher (Geffen, 1987)
With Candi Staton
 Chance (Warner Bros. Records, 1979)
With Aretha Franklin
 La Diva (Atlantic Records, 1979)
With Melanie
 Phonogenic – Not Just Another Pretty Face (Midsong International, 1978)
With Michael Bolton
 The Hunger (Columbia Records, 1987)
 Soul Provider (Columbia Records, 1989)
With Bruce Cockburn
 Dart to the Heart (True North Records, 1994)
With Robert Palmer
 Double Fun (Island Records, 1978)
With Judy Collins
 Home Again (Elektra Records, 1984)
With Melba Moore
 Melba '76 (Buddah Records, 1976)
With Natalie Cole
 Stardust (Elektra Records, 1996)
With Phoebe Snow
 Never Letting Go (Sony, 1977)
With Loudon Wainwright III
 History (Charisma Records, 1992)
With Chaka Khan
 CK (Warner Bros. Records, 1988)
With Irene Cara
 Anyone Can See (Network Records, 1982)
With Teddy Pendergrass
 TP (Philadelphia International, 1980)
With Art Garfunkel
 Songs from a Parent to a Child (Columbia Records, 1997)
With Elvis Costello
 Painted from Memory (Mercury Records, 1998)
With Barry Manilow
 Barry Manilow II (Arista Records, 1974)
With Donald Fagen
 Kamakiriad (Reprise Records, 1993)
With Michael Franks
 Passionfruit (Warner Bros. Records, 1983)
 Skin Dive (Warner Bros. Records, 1985)
 The Camera Never Lies (Warner Bros. Records, 1987)
 Abandoned Garden (Warner Bros. Records, 1995)
With Patricia Kaas
 Dans ma chair (Columbia Records, 1997)
With Laura Nyro
 Smile (Columbia Records, 1976)
With Maria Muldaur
 Maria Muldaur (Reprise Records, 1973)
With Jackie Lomax
 Livin' For Lovin (Capitol Records, 1976)With Don McLean Don McLean (United Artists Records, 1972)With Taeko Ohnuki'''Sunshower'' (PANAM, 1977)

References

Living people
20th-century births
Date of birth missing (living people)
20th-century American drummers
American male drummers
Saturday Night Live Band members
20th-century American male musicians
Year of birth missing (living people)
Stuff (band) members
Origin Records artists